After Dark is an album by saxophonist Hank Crawford recorded in 1998 and released on the Milestone label.

Reception 

Allmusic's Alex Henderson said: "After Dark finds Hank Crawford excelling by sticking to what he does so well: uncomplicated, blues-drenched, gospel-minded soul-jazz. Warmth and accessibility continued to define the veteran alto saxophonist, who sounds like he's still very much in his prime". In JazzTimes, Miles Jordan called it a "blues-saturated disc which features altoist Crawford with a terrific combo" and noted "Crawford is through and through a bluseman, albeit one without portfolio. Maybe there’s too much “jazz” in his playing. Whatever the case, this CD-like most of his work definitely deserves a bigger audience".

Track listing
 "My Babe" (Willie Dixon) – 5:41
 "Share Your Love with Me" (Alfred Braggs, Deadric Malone) – 5:03
 "Git It!" (Melvin Sparks) – 7:31
 "Tain't Nobody's Bizness If I Do" (Porter Grainger, Everett Robbins) – 5:54
 "Our Day Will Come" (Mort Garson, Bob Hilliard) – 7:23
 "Mother Nature" (Hank Crawford) – 6:24
 "That's All" (Bob Haymes, Alan Brandt) – 5:11
 "St. Louis Blues" (W. C. Handy) – 6:21
 "Beale Street After Dark" (Hank Crawford) – 7:21
 "Amazing Grace" (John Newton) – 5:50

Personnel
Hank Crawford  – alto saxophone
Danny Mixon – piano, organ
Melvin Sparks – guitar
Wilbur Bascomb (tracks 1, 5, 9 & 10), Stanley Banks (tracks 2-4, 7 & 8)  - bass
Bernard Purdie − drums

References

Milestone Records albums
Hank Crawford albums
1998 albums
Albums produced by Bob Porter (record producer)
Albums recorded at Van Gelder Studio